Tar Tay Gyi, is a 2017 Burmese comedy horror film starring Nay Toe and Shwe Thamee. The film produced by Lu Swan Kaung Production premiered in Myanmar on November 24, 2017. The film is an unofficial remake of the 2011 Indian Tamil-language film Muni 2: Kanchana.

Plot 

Ye Khaung, who was cowardly afraid of ghosts, later encountered a unknown spirit from the grounds of old abandoned house. Being possessed by three ghosts from previous life which troubled their family. Exorcism led to ghosts surrendered and told about his miserable life after being cast away by his father for being gay wanted vengeance for death of their family.

Cast
Nay Toe as Tar Tar/Ye Khaung
Shwe Thamee as Nandar

Aung Min as Ye Khaung's brother in law

Zaw Oo as head exorcist master

Than Myaing

Ko Ko Oo

Award

References

2017 films
2010s Burmese-language films
Burmese comedy horror films
Films shot in Myanmar
Remakes of Indian films
2017 comedy horror films
Films directed by Wyne